Christella parasitica is a species of fern in the Thelypteridaceae family. A widespread species found in many parts of the world. In Australia, this fern is recorded from Queensland, Norfolk Island and northern New South Wales.

References

Thelypteridaceae
Flora of New South Wales
Flora of Norfolk Island
Flora of Queensland
Flora of Oceania
Flora of China
Flora of India (region)
Flora of Japan
Flora of Hawaii